The Andaikhudag Formation, in older literature referred to as Unduruh Formation or Ondorukhaa Formation, is an Early Cretaceous (Hauterivian to Barremian) geologic formation in Mongolia. Dinosaur remains diagnostic to the genus level are among the fossils that have been recovered from the formation.

Fossil content 
The following fossils have been reported from the lacustrine shales and secondary sandstones of the formation:

Birds
 Ambiortus dementjevi - "Vertebrae and forelimb"
 Holbotia ponomarenkoi

Insects
 Hymenoptera
 Kotujisca kholbotensis
 Neoxyelula reducta
 Palaeoichneumon townesi
 Diptera
 Syntemna tele
 Ulaia communis
 Coleoptera
 Allophalerus bontsaganensis
 Tetraphalerus notatus
 Plecoptera
 Accretonemoura radiata

See also 
 List of dinosaur-bearing rock formations
 List of stratigraphic units with few dinosaur genera
 Tsagaantsav Formation

References

Bibliography 

  
 
  
 
 
 
 
 
 
 

Geologic formations of Mongolia
Lower Cretaceous Series of Asia
Cretaceous Mongolia
Barremian Stage
Hauterivian Stage
Shale formations
Sandstone formations
Lacustrine deposits
Paleontology in Mongolia
Formations